Brian Zins is a retired United States Marine Corps Military Police Gunnery Sergeant. He is also a competitive shooter known for his proficiency with the M1911 pistol with which he holds various records at the NRA and other events. He is also known for competing in the second season of History Channel's marksmen competition Top Shot.

Early years

Brian Zins was raised in Canfield, Ohio. He grew up playing baseball and also learn how to juggle at a young age, both of which he credits for his good hand–eye coordination in shooting. After graduating from high school, Zins went to college to study Law Enforcement. However, he decided to quit and joined the United States Marine Corps in 1988.

Military career

After completing the Recruit training program at Parris Island, South Carolina, Zins attended the Military Police School at Lackland Air Force Base, San Antonio, Texas. During that time, he received the Top Gun Award for having the highest qualification score with the M1911 pistol.

Through his career of 20 years at the Marine Corps, Zins served in various capacities, like:
Primary Marksmanship Instructor
Assigned to Weapons Training Battalion in Quantico, Virginia
Permanent member of the Marine Corps Pistol Team
Mobile Training Team at Camp Lejeune, North Carolina
Military Police Patrol Supervisor, Watch Commander, and Hostage Rescue Team's designated marksman in Iwakuni, Japan (1994)
Recruiter in the Detroit area for three years
Doctrine developer with Marksmanship Program Management Section (2004)
Staff Non-Commissioned Officer in Charge of the Pistol Team (2006 - 2008)

During that time, he participated in various competitions, setting several records.

 1991, first Lance Corporal to become Pistol Distinguished
 1992, 2nd Place at the NRA National Matches at Camp Perry, Ohio
 1993–1994, 1st Place at the Inter-service Pistol Championship with the Pistol Team
 2006, set National Records for the Center Fire 900 and Center Fire Timed Fire
 2006, tied National Record for the .45 National Match Course
 2006, 2nd Place at the NRA National Matches
 2007, set National Record Score for Military Police Corps Trophy
 12x National Pistol Champion (1996, 1998, 2001, 2002, 2003, 2004, 2005, 2007, 2008, 2010, 2012 and 2013)

Zins retired from the Marine Corps in May 2008.

Post-military career

Since retiring from active duty, Zins has worked as National Manager of NRA Pistol Programs in the Competitive Shooting division. He also works as an independent security contractor. Zins also started his own line of ammunition called Gunny Zins Ammo. In 2011, he was hired by Cabot Gun Company as spokesman and ambassador. In 2012 he married Mary Jo Boomhower and they reside in Ohio. He has two children, Connor and Danielle and 3 stepchildren, Connor Loze, Laney Boggs, and Jacob Manente.

In 2017 Brian and Mary relocated to Monroe, North Carolina where he accepted a position as Training Director at Point Blank Range in Matthews, North Carolina. He oversees all training programs at Point Blank Range and conducts his Bulls-eye Competition class as well a 1911 – 101 course.

Top Shot

In 2011, Zins appeared in the second season of History Channel's marksmen competition Top Shot. During the first half of the competition, Zins competed as part of the Red Team. His team ended up winning six challenges, and Brian was never nominated for elimination during that period. During the final half of the competition, Zins won three of the last individual challenges before the final. In the final, he lost to Chris Reed.

In 2013, Zins appeared in the fifth season. He finished fourth overall out of 16 all-star contestants from previous seasons.

References

External links
 Brian Zins Bio on History Channel
 

Living people
American male sport shooters
United States Distinguished Marksman
People from Canfield, Ohio
United States Marine Corps non-commissioned officers
Year of birth missing (living people)